David Cornelisz. de Heem (1663, Antwerp – 1701, The Hague), was a Dutch Golden Age painter.

Biography
According to the RKD he is also known as David Cornelisz de Heem III. He was the son of Cornelis de Heem and moved with his parents to Utrecht in 1667. He painted in the family tradition started by Jan Davidsz de Heem and lived in the Hague 1676–1701. He became a member of the Antwerp Guild of St. Luke in 1693 though he was probably still living in the Hague.

References

 
David Cornelisz de Heem on Artnet

1663 births
1701 deaths
Dutch Golden Age painters
Dutch male painters
Painters from Antwerp